This is a chronological summary of the major events of the 2020 Summer Olympics in Tokyo, Japan, which was postponed to 2021 due to the COVID-19 pandemic. The first matches in the group stages of the football and softball events was held on 21 July. The opening ceremony was scheduled two days later on 23 July. The last day of competition and the closing ceremony was on 8 August. However, the Games was referred to by its original date in all scheduled events in order to avoid confusion in future years. With the area under a state of emergency because of the pandemic, the Games were held largely behind closed doors with no spectators permitted.

The games featured 339 events in 33 different sports, encompassing a total of 50 disciplines. The 2020 Games saw the introduction of new competitions including 3x3 basketball, freestyle BMX, and madison cycling, in the latter case for women (the men's version was held between 2000 and 2008 before returning in these games), as well as further mixed events. These Games also saw karate, sport climbing, surfing, and skateboarding make their Olympic debuts, as well as the return of baseball and softball for the first time since 2008.

About 206 teams were expected to participate. This was the first Olympics since the June 2018 signing of the Prespa agreement between Greece and the Republic of Macedonia over the "Macedonia" naming dispute, resulting in the latter officially being renamed North Macedonia. This was also the second consecutive Summer Olympics that selected independent Olympic participants compete under the Olympic Flag as part of the "Refugee Olympic Team". As a result of the 2020 ruling by the Court of Arbitration for Sport on the Russian doping scandal, Russian athletes competed under the acronym "ROC" after the name of the Russian Olympic Committee, and under the flag of the Russian Olympic Committee.

Calendar

Medal table

Day-by-day summaries

Day (-2) — Wednesday 21 July
 Football
 The first matches in the group stage of the women's tournament were played.

 Softball
 Group stage begins.

Day (-1) — Thursday 22 July
 Football
 The first matches in the group stage of the Men's tournament were played.

 Softball
 Second day of the group stages.

Day 0 — Friday 23 July

 Rowing
 The heats in the men's single sculls, women's single sculls, men's double sculls, women's double sculls, men's quadruple sculls and women's quadruple sculls took place.

 Opening ceremony
 The opening ceremony was held at Japan National Stadium at 20:00 JST (UTC+9).

Day 1 — Saturday 24 July

Day 2 — Sunday 25 July

Day 3 — Monday 26 July

Day 4 — Tuesday 27 July

*Simone Biles withdrew from the finals.

Day 5 — Wednesday 28 July

Day 6 — Thursday 29 July

Day 7 — Friday 30 July

Day 8 — Saturday 31 July

Day 9 — Sunday 1 August

Day 10 — Monday 2 August

Day 11 — Tuesday 3 August

Day 12 — Wednesday 4 August

Day 13 — Thursday 5 August

Day 14 — Friday 6 August

Day 15 — Saturday 7 August

Day 16 — Sunday 8 August
 Closing ceremony
 At Japan National Stadium. It included the traditional Olympic flag handover to Paris, France, the host city of the next Summer Olympics in 2024.

Notes

References

External links 
Tokyo 2020

2020 Summer Olympics
2020